The 2008–09 Superliga Feminina Brasileira de Voleibol season was the 15th edition of the Championship; it began on October 29, 2008.

Competition formula

 Twelve teams
 Two pools of six team each one
 There are four rounds with one champion in each round
 Each team plays one match against all the others in its pool
 The first place of the pools competes for the title of round
 The eight best teams after the four rounds of overall ranking, competes for the title of Superliga

Teams

 Rexona-Ades/Rio de Janeiro
 Finasa/Osasco
 São Caetano/Blausiegel
 Pinheiros/Mackenzie
 Brusque/Brasil Telecom
 Mackenzie/Cia. do Terno
 Medley/Banespa
 Vôlei Futuro
 Sport/Maurício de Nassau
 Cativa/Pomerode/ADP
 Usiminas/Minas
 Praia Clube/Futel

First round

Second round

Third round

Fourth round

Overall ranking

External links
Superliga Brasileira de Voleibol official website
CBV – Confederação Brasileira de Voleibol official website

Volleyball competitions in Brazil
National volleyball leagues
Women's volleyball leagues
Superliga Feminina Brasileira de Voleibol
Superliga Feminina Brasileira de Voleibol
Superliga Feminina Brasileira de Voleibol
Superliga Feminina Brasileira de Voleibol